Tyrone Lewis Kidd (born September 15, 1997) is an American football offensive tackle for the New Orleans Saints of the National Football League (NFL). He played college football at Montana State.

Professional career
Kidd signed with the New Orleans Saints as an undrafted free agent on April 30, 2022, following the 2022 NFL Draft. He made the Saints' final 53 man roster after training camp.

References

External links
 New Orleans Saints bio
 Montana State Bobcats bio

1997 births
Living people
American football offensive tackles
Players of American football from Minneapolis
Montana State Bobcats football players
New Orleans Saints players